The 2001 Preakness Stakes was the 126th running of the Preakness Stakes thoroughbred horse race. The race took place on May 19, 2001, and was televised in the United States on the NBC television network. Point Given, who was jockeyed by Gary Stevens, won the race by two and one quarter lengths over runner-up A P Valentine. Approximate post time was 6:09 p.m. Eastern Time. The race was run over a fast track in a final time of 1:55.51.  The Maryland Jockey Club reported total attendance of 118,926, this is recorded as second highest on the list of American thoroughbred racing top attended events for North America in 2001.

Payout 

The 126th Preakness Stakes Payout Schedule

 $2 Exacta: (11–4) paid $81.40
 $2 Trifecta: (11–4–5) paid $279.00
 $1 Superfecta: (11–4–5–10) paid $717.13

The full chart 

 Winning Breeder: The Thoroughbred Corporation; (KY)   
 Final Time:  1:55.51
 Track Condition:  Fast
 Total Attendance: 118,926

See also 

 2001 Kentucky Derby
 2001 Belmont Stakes

References

External links 

 

2001
2001 in horse racing
2001 in American sports
2001 in sports in Maryland
Horse races in Maryland